Ziph was a town in the Judean Mountains (Joshua 15:55) south-east of Hebron. Here David hid himself from Saul (1 Samuel 23:19; Psalm 54). The name of Zif is found about four miles south of Hebron, attached to a rounded hill of some 100 feet in height, which is called Tell Zif. Its name appears on a number of LMLK seals along with those of Hebron, Socoh and MMST. It has been identified as the Palestinian village of Zif, Hebron.

From archaeology

Scholars debate the interpretation of the word Z(Y)F on LMLK seals. It may be a reference to an economic center established at the site south-east of Hebron during the reign of King Hezekiah (circa 700 BC), or it may be a literal votive inscription meaning "battlement", "flowing", "mouthful", "pinnacle", or "supply" (Grena, 2004, pp. 51, 360–2).

See also
 Zif, the modern-day Palestinian village near Hebron

References

External links
 ZYF LMLK seals

Hebrew Bible cities
Books of Samuel